The 2023 St. Francis Brooklyn Terriers men's volleyball team represents Saint Francis College in the 2023 NCAA Division I & II men's volleyball season. The Terriers, led by first year head coach Justin Beaumont, play their home games at Generoso Pope Athletic Complex. The Terriers compete as a member of the newly created Northeast Conference men's volleyball conference. The Terriers were picked to finish second in the NEC pre-season poll.

Season highlights
Nicola Iannelli won the National Setter of the Week award for Week 0 games.

Roster

Schedule
TV/Internet Streaming information:
All home games will be streamed on NEC Front Row. Most road games will be streamed by the schools streaming service.

 *-Indicates conference match.
 Times listed are Eastern Time Zone.

Announcers for televised games
Springfield: 
NJIT: 
Lewis: 
Loyola Chicago: 
Princeton: 
St. Francis: 
Fairleigh Dickinson: 
D'Youville: 
Daemen: 
Harvard: 
American International: 
LIU: 
LIU: 
Randolph-Macon: 
Kean: 
Sacred Heart: 
Merrimack: 
D'Youville: 
Daemen: 
St. Francis: 
Fairleigh Dickinson: 
Sacred Heart: 
Merrimack:

References

2023 in sports in New York (state)
St. Francis Brooklyn
St. Francis Brooklyn